John Rowan may refer to:

John Rowan (Kentucky politician) (1773–1843), politician and jurist from the U.S. state of Kentucky
John Rowan (New York), assemblyman 1777-78
John Rowan (psychologist), author, counselor, psychotherapist and clinical supervisor
John Rowan (Vietnam War veteran), sixth National President of Vietnam Veterans of America
John Rowan (United States Navy) (1919–2012), U.S. Navy captain
John M. Rowan (1829–?), politician from the U.S. state of Virginia
John Rowan (footballer) (1890-1963), Scottish footballer
 John Rowan (American football) (1896–1967)

See also
Jon Rowan, English footballer